"Rebota" is a single by Puerto Rican rapper Guaynaa.

Charts

Certifications

Remix version

On July 12, 2019 a remix version featuring vocals by Nicky Jam, Farruko, Becky G and Sech was released.

Charts

Certifications

References

Nicky Jam songs
Songs written by Nicky Jam
Farruko songs
Becky G songs
Songs written by Becky G
Sech (singer) songs